Safarabad-e Chin (also Romanized as Şafarābād-e Chīn; also known as Şafarābād and Z̧afarābād) is a village in Chin Rural District, Ludab District, Boyer-Ahmad County, Kohgiluyeh and Boyer-Ahmad Province, Iran. At the 2006 census, its population was 219, in 42 families.

References 

Populated places in Boyer-Ahmad County